Miloš Beleslin (8 September 1901 – 7 March 1984) was a Serbian Yugoslavia international football player.  He was among the best defenders in the Yugoslav First League during the 1920s however he was overshadowed by the players from the major Yugoslav clubs.

Career
Born in Sereg, Kingdom of Hungary, Austro-Hungarian Empire, he started playing in Szeged in Szegedi AK. His played his first official match on May 5, 1917. In 1919 his parents moved to the city of Novi Sad in the Kingdom of Serbs, Croats and Slovenes and he joined NAK Novi Sad.  Later he would play with other Yugoslav top-league clubs, SAND Subotica and ŽAK Subotica.  He played his last official match in 1939 on the day of his anniversary.

National team
Miloš Beleslin played 8 matches for the Yugoslav national team having scored once. He was part of Yugoslavia's team at the 1928 Summer Olympics, but he did not play in any matches. He received a call to represent Yugoslavia at the 1930 FIFA World Cup however as he was playing in Subotica, his representative subassociation, the Subotica Football Subassociation, boycotted the national team, not allowing him to travel to Uruguay.

References

1901 births
1984 deaths
Serbian footballers
Yugoslav footballers
Yugoslavia international footballers
NAK Novi Sad players
SAND Subotica players
ŽAK Subotica players
Yugoslav First League players
Footballers at the 1928 Summer Olympics
Olympic footballers of Yugoslavia
Association football defenders